AJ Saint-Georges are a French Guianese football club based in the country's capital Cayenne.  They have won the French Guiana Championnat National six times: in 1965, 1983, 1984, 1999, 2000 and 2002.
The club was relegated to Promotion d'Honneur (Second Level) in 2007.

Achievements
French Guiana Championnat National: 6
 1964/65, 1982/83, 1983/84, 1998/99, 1999/00, 2001/02
Coupe de Guyane: 14
 1959/60, 1964/65, 1965/66, 1968/69, 1970/71, 1979/80, 1982/83, 1983/84, 1984/85, 1989/90, 1999/00, 2000/01, 2002/03, 2003/04

The club in the French football structure
French Cup : 7 appearances

 1966/67, 1975/76, 1980/81, 1996/97, 1997/98, 1999/00, 2019-20.
Ties won:
1980/81 AJ Saint-Georges 0-0 Véloce Vannes US (aet, 7-6 pens), (rd 7)

References 

Saint-Georges